Metallurg Mednogorsk is an ice hockey team in Mednogorsk, Russia. They play in the Pervaya Liga, the third level of Russian ice hockey. The club was founded in 1956.

External links
Official site

Ice hockey teams in Russia